Piabucina is a genus of freshwater fishes found in Central and South America.  The nine currently recognized species in this genus are:
 Piabucina astrigata Regan, 1903
 Piabucina aureoguttata Fowler, 1911
 Piabucina boruca W. A. Bussing, 1967
 Piabucina elongata Boulenger, 1887
 Piabucina erythrinoides Valenciennes, 1850
 Piabucina festae Boulenger, 1899
 Piabucina panamensis T. N. Gill, 1877
 Piabucina pleurotaenia Regan, 1903
 Piabucina unitaeniata Günther, 1864

References
 

Lebiasinidae
Taxa named by Achille Valenciennes